Barbara Nawrocka-Dońska (17 October 1924 – 15 May 2018) was a Polish prose writer, essayist and journalist. She was born in Warsaw.

World War II years
During World War II, Nawrocka-Dońska was a soldier of the Home Army and took part in the Warsaw Uprising.

She was elevated, by decision of the President of the Republic of Poland, Lech Wałęsa, to second lieutenant of the Polish Army. By order of the Minister of National Defense, Jerzy Szmajdziński, she was promoted to lieutenant.

Career
Nawrocka-Dońska graduated from the Faculty of Law at the University of Warsaw.

Nawrocka-Dońska was the author of over 500 articles in the daily and field press, Warsaw cultural weeklies, including reports, critical-literary articles, film critics and the culture section in Trybuna Ludu; reports from over a dozen stays in the Soviet Union, from China, France, Switzerland, Italy, Greece and Cuba. She also wrote in the women's press, including Zwierciadło.

She was a member:
 Association of Polish Writers in 1958-1990
 The Main Board, the chairwoman of the ZLP Cooperation Commission with the Book House, then until 1990 she was chairwoman of the Loan Fund Committee 
 Association of Authors ZAiKS 1959-
 Association of Journalists of the Republic of Poland 1982-
 International Publicity Club
 Union of Warsaw Insurgents 1990-
 Association of Polish Writers in February 2000-
 Association of European Culture March 2000-

Nawrocka-Dońska published 28 books, including 5 book editions of foreign reports.

Personal life
Her husband was journalist  (1923-1973). They had a daughter, Małgorzata Dońska-Olszko, an educator, and a son, Jacek Nawrocki, who died in 2002.

Barbara Nawrocka-Dońska died on 15 May 2018 in Warsaw at the age of 93.

References

1924 births
2018 deaths
Polish military personnel of World War II
Polish journalists
Polish women journalists
Polish essayists
Polish women essayists
Writers from Warsaw
20th-century Polish women